Tympanocryptis pinguicolla, also known as Victorian grassland earless dragon, is a species of lizard in the family Agamidae. It is one of a documented species of a relatively small dragon belonging to the genus Tympanocryptis.

Taxonomy 
Numerous other species of Tympanocryptis across Australia were formerly classified under T. pinguicolla, but all of these have ultimately been split due to scientific studies finding them to be distinct species. Two populations from the Darling Downs were found in a 2014 study to actually be two new, distinct species, T. condaminensis and T. wilsoni. A 2019 study found a population near Canberra to actually represent an isolated eastern population of T. lineata, while two populations near Cooma and Bathurst respectively represented two new species, T. osbornei and T. mccartneyi. This has left the Victorian population to be the only representative member of the species.

Distribution 
T. pinguicolla is endemic to the state of Victoria in southeastern Australia. As with the other grassland earless dragons, it is restricted to areas of temperate grassland with tussock and smaller grasses. Very little of this habitat remains in Victoria due to the heavy degradation and conversion of this habitat in the past, which has contributed to the species' endangerment.

Threats and conservation 
T. pinguicolla is classified as Endangered on the IUCN Red List, but this was based on the former view that classified the Canberra, Cooma, and Bathurst populations under T. pinguicolla. Based on recent studies, it is highly likely that T. pinguicolla is extinct, due to the destruction of most of its habitat and the last sighting of the species being made in 1969. If the species is extinct, it could represent the first known reptilian extinction on the Australian mainland in modern times. The species may have gone extinct due to the intensive land use and conversion in the basalt grasslands surrounding the highly populated city of Melbourne.

However, there is some hope that the species may still survive. Unconfirmed sightings have been made during surveys from 1988–1990, though later searches in the surveyed areas did not uncover any individuals. Not all of the remaining grasslands in the area have been intensively surveyed and the species is small and hard to detect. The conservation organization Zoos Victoria has been involved in conducting surveys in order to find any surviving individuals.

References 

pinguicolla
Endemic fauna of Australia
Agamid lizards of Australia
Reptiles of Victoria (Australia)
Extinct animals of Australia
Reptiles described in 1948
Taxa named by Francis John Mitchell